The Killerpilze (German for "Killer Mushrooms") is a German pop rock/pop punk band from Dillingen an der Donau, Germany. Recently, the band has also scheduled a show in Russia alongside another German band called "Panik".

History
Killerpilze was formed in October 2002 in Dillingen an der Donau. They came upon the name while they were eating pizza. In their early years, Killerpilze sang in both English and German, and toured their local area. The three band members have balanced their ongoing primary education and recording activities.
 
On July 7, 2004, the group recorded its first album Von vorne durch die Punkalle. They performed in small concert halls until Universal Music noticed them, resulting in a record deal. In 2005, they recorded their first official album  Invasion der Killerpilze. In spring 2006, their debut single "Richtig Scheiße" ("Really Shitty") reached #17 in Germany.

On July 27, 2007, the band released its second album Mit Pauken und Raketen. Their album peaked to 19 in the German charts.

In July 2008, their song "Verrockt" is used in the German soundtrack of Camp Rock.

In 2010, the band created its own label, KillerpilzeRecords. On February 12 of the same year, the first single "Drei" from their third album Lautonom was released. In the end of 2010, the group returned to the studio and recorded their fourth album Ein Bisschen Zeitgeist.
  
The band has contributed to campaigns such as Kein Bock auf Nazis (No Support for Nazis), and Punk Macht Schule, which helps to build schools in Ethiopia.

Members 
Johannes "Jo" Halbig plays rhythm guitar, piano and sings.
Fabian "Fabi" Halbig is the drummer.
Maximilian "Mäx" Schlichter has played lead guitar and sings.
Andreas "Schlagi" Schlagenhaft was the former bassist of the band.

Johannes Halbig
Johannes Halbig, (better known as Jo) was born on the July 30, 1989. He had just completed his last year at the German high school 'St. Bonaventura Gymnasium' in Dillingen an der Donau, where he lives with his family. Jo plays a range of instruments, including piano, guitar, and bass guitar.

Fabian Halbig
Fabian Halbig (also known as Fabi) was born on December 23, 1992. He is the youngest member of the band, and also plays trumpet. He has done so since the age of eight. 

Filmography

Maximilian Schlichter
Maximilian Schlichter, (known as Mäx) was born on July 3, 1988. Mäx is the oldest in the band, and has played lead guitar and sings.

Discography

Album
2004: Von Vorne durch die Punkallee ("Straight Through Punk Avenue")
2006: Invasion der Killerpilze ("Invasion of Killerpilze") (#2 Austria, #7 Germany, #47 Switzerland, #62 France)
2007: Mit Pauken und Raketen (With drums and rockets) (#14 Germany, #15 Austria, #55 France, #58 Switzerland)
2010: Lautonom
2011: Ein bisschen Zeitgeist
2013: Grell
2014: Postkarten
2016: HIGH

Singles
 2006: "'Richtig scheisse (auf 'ne schöne Art und Weise)" ("Really Shitty (In a Good Way)") – #10 Austria, #17 Germany, #62 Switzerland
 2006: "Springt hoch" ("Jump High") – #27 Austria, #35 Germany, #40 Switzerland
 2006: "Ich kann auch ohne dich" ("I Can Go On Without You Too") – #13 Austria, #30 Germany, #34 Swiss
 2007: "Liebmichhassmich" ("Lovemehateme") – #19 Germany, #32 Austria, #83 Swiss
 2007: "Ich Brauche Nichts" ("I don't need anything")
 2007: "Letzte Minute" ("Last Minute") – TBA
 2008: "Stress Im Nightliner" ("Stress in the Sleeper Bus") – TBA
 2008: "Verrockt" ("We Rock") – #84 Germany
 2010: "Drei" ("Three") – #72 Germany
 2010: "Am Meer" ("At the sea") – #TBS Germany
 2010: "Plastik" ("Plastic")
 2011: "KOMM KOMM.COM" ("come come.com")
 2011: "Jubel und Staub" ("rejoicing and dust")
 2013: "Nimm mich mit" ("Take me with You")
 2013: "Sommerregen" ("Summer Rain")
 2013: "Die Stadt klingt immer noch nach uns" ("The Town still sounds like us")
 2015: "H.E.A.R.T."
 2016: "RUINEN" ("Ruins")

Soundtrack
2008: Camp Rock (soundtrack) – Verrockt ("We Rock")
2009: Vorstadtkrokodile – Der Moment ("The Moment")
2010: Vorstadtkrokodile 2 – Legendär ("Legendary")
2011: Vorstadtkrokodile 3 – Rendezvous ("Appointment/Date")

Track listings
Von vorne durch die Punkallee (Straight Through Punk Avenue)
1. Am Meer
2. Von Vorne ("Straight")
3. Schönes Mädchen ("Attractive Girl")
4. A Few Days
5. Kompliment ("Compliment")
6. Rockstar
7. Für Dich ("For You")
8. Ich Wär so Gern ("I'm a Volunteer Boy")
9. Punkstorm
10. Bikini Frau ("Bikini's Woman")
11. Antirassismus ("Anti-Racism")
12. Outro

Invasion der Killerpilze (Invasion of the Killerpilze)
1. Ferngesteuert ("Remote-controlled")
2. Stubenrocker ("Homerocker")
3. Richtig Scheisse (auf 'ne schöne Art und Weise) ("Really Shitty (In a Good Way)")
4. Sommer ("Summer")
5. Springt hoch ("Jump High")
6. Scheissegal ("Don't Give a Shit")
7. Ich kann auch ohne dich ("I Can Go On Without You Too")
8. Blümchensex ("Floretsex")
9. Komm mit ("Come along")
10. Ich habe recht ("I'm right")
11. Hier und jetzt ("Here and now")
12. Lass mich los ("Release Me")
13. Ich hasse dich ("I Hate You")
14. Wach auf ("Wake Up")

Mit Pauken und Raketen (With Kettledrums and Rockets)
1. Los ("Slack")
2. Der Moment ("The Moment")
3. Liebmichhassmich ("Lovemehateme")
4. Meine Welt dreht sich ("My world is turning")
5. Für mich geschaffen ("Created for me")
6. Ich will Gerechtigkeit ("I Want Justice")
7. Wir ("We")
8. 40 Tage 13 Stunden ("40 Days 13 Hours")
9. Ich bin raus ("I'm out")
10. Stress Im Nightliner ("Stress in the Sleeper Bus")
11. Richtig oder falsch ("True or False")
12. Ich brauche nichts ("I Don't Need Anything")
13. Andere Zeit ("Different Time")
14. Letzte Minute ("Last Minute")

Lautonom

1. Drei ("Three")
2. Es geht auch um dich ("It's about you,too")
3. Halbromantisch ("Half Romantic")
4. Rendezvous ("Appointment/Date")
5. Am Meer ("At the Sea")
6. Raus ("Out")
7. Bankband ("Bank Band")
8. Lieblingssong ("Favourite song")
9. Denken ("Think")
10.Ego ("Ego")
11. Grauer Vorhang ("Grey curtain")
12.Schwarzer Kreis ("Black Circle")
13.Plastik ("Plastic")

Ein Bisschen Zeitgeist
1. Boom 
2. Wenn Blicke treffen ("When Gazes Meet")
3. Jubel und Staub ("Jubilation and Dust")
4. Komm Komm.com ("Come Come.com")
5. Marie
6. Albtrauma
7. So Weit so Gut ("So Far So Good")
8. Zeitgeist
9. Schicksalsschiess ("Fate Shit")
10. Morgenland ("The Orient")
11. 97 Tage ("97 Days")
12. Alles Kaputt ("Everything's broken")

Grell
1. Jäger (Das kann doch nicht alles sein Pt.I)
2. Grell
3. Die Stadt klingt immer noch nach uns ("The city still sounds according to us")
4. Erster Zug nach Paris ("First train to Paris")
5. Nimm mich mit (" Take me with you")
6. Sommerregen ("Summer rain")
7. A.W.I.T.M. ("All I have to do")
8. Studieren ("Study")
9. Atomic
10. Lauf (Das kann doch nicht alles sein Pt.II) ("Running") 
11. Himmel I (Prelude) ("Heaven I")
12. Himmel II ("Heaven II")
13. Himmel III ("Heaven III")

External links
  Official site
 Killerpilze (MySpace)

German musical groups